Richard Hill (born December 30, 1946) is an American politician and businessman who served as a member of the United States House of Representatives from Montana. He was the Republican nominee for Governor of Montana in 2012.

Early life and education
Hill was born in Grand Rapids, Minnesota. He was one of four children and grew up in a one-room apartment in the back of a tire repair shop. At age four, Hill was paralyzed by polio. In 1964, he graduated from Aitkin High School in Aitkin, Minnesota. In 1968, he graduated from Saint Cloud State University Hill received his Juris Doctor degree in 2005 from the Concord Law School in Los Angeles, California.

Early career 
Hill owned a surety bonding company prior to entering politics.

He served as Republican precinct committeeman and state committeeman from Lewis and Clark County, Montana; member, served on the board of directors, Montana Science and Technology Alliance; and chaired the Montana State Worker’s Compensation Board from 1993 to 1996.

In 1993, Governor Marc Racicot selected Hill to act as Chairman of the Board of Directors of the Montana State Fund, where he worked in a volunteer, unpaid capacity for three years. At the time Hill became chairman, the organization had a $500 million debt. After leaving the post, he worked to cut the pay and pensions of the state employees charged with administering the fund.

U.S. House of Representatives

Elections
In 1996, Hill ran for the U.S. House of Representatives in Montana's at-large congressional district. He won the Republican primary with 44% of the vote. In the general election, he defeated Democrat Bill Yellowtail, who had been a Regional Administrator for the United States Environmental Protection Agency, 52%–43%. In November 1998, Hill won re-election to a second term, defeating the Democratic nominee, longtime Missoula County Attorney Dusty Deschamps, 53%–44%.

In 2000, Hill decided not to run for re-election to a third term, citing vision problems, which were subsequently corrected. The election was won by Republican nominee Denny Rehberg, who defeated Nancy Keenan, then the three-term State Superintendent of Public Instruction.

Tenure
Between 1997 and 2000, Hill sponsored 32 bills, of which 22 did not made it out of committee and four were passed into law by Congress. He voted with the Republican party 91% of the time.

Committee assignments
Hill served on the U.S. House Committee on Natural Resources.

2012 gubernatorial election

In November 2010, Hill announced he would run for Governor of Montana in 2012. He selected State Senator Jon Sonju as his running mate. On November 6, 2012, Hill lost to his Democratic opponent, Steve Bullock, in the general election by a margin of 48.9%–47.3%.

Personal life
In May 1976, Hill filed for divorce from his first wife, Mary Hill ( Spaulding), after having an affair with another woman. In 1980, after the couple failed to reconcile, Spaulding filed for divorce and Hill obtained custody of the three children. He married his second wife, Betti, in 1983.

References

External links
 
 

|-

|-

1946 births
Living people
People from Grand Rapids, Minnesota
Politicians from Helena, Montana
Republican Party members of the United States House of Representatives from Montana